Fan Rui is a fictional character in Water Margin, one of the Four Great Classical Novels in Chinese literature. Nicknamed "Demon King of Chaos", he ranks 61st among the 108 Stars of Destiny and 25th among the 72 Earthly Fiends.

Background
Fan Rui, a native of Puzhou (濮州; around present-day Juancheng County, Shandong), is fearsome-looking with untidy hair.  In battles he dons armour over a silk robe and fights with a sword called "Netherworld Demon King Sword"  and a mace called "Dark Chain-Swinging Spiked Mace". He can manipulate the weather and conjure strong winds with Taoist sorcery, which earns him the nickname "Demon King of Chaos".

With Xiang Chong and Li Gun as his sidekicks, Fan Rui leads a 3,000-strong outlaw band at Mount Mangdang (芒碭山; north of present-day Yongcheng, Henan).

Joining Liangshan 
The three chiefs of Mount Mangdang have been boasting about wiping out the Liangshan stronghold. Their brag angers Liangshan, which sends Shi Jin to subdue them. But Shi cannot not hold up against the assault of Xiang Chong and Li Gun, who bear down on his men with speed and ferocity, causing heavy casualties. Song Jiang arrives with reinforcement.

The following day, when both sides face off again, Gongsun Sheng arrays the Liangshan troops in the pattern of the Eight Trigrams Formation. Fan Rui, who knows sorcery, assists Xiang Chong and Li Gun in their attack by unsettling the other side with blasting winds and flying pebbles. But Gongsun engulfs Xiang and Li in darkness, trapping them in the formation and driving them into a pit. Meanwhile, Song Jiang's force swarms forward, beating Fan back to his base.

Song Jiang treats the two captives with respect and convinces them to join Liangshan. The two return to Mount Mangdang and successfully help to recruit Fan Rui. As Fan admires Gongsun Sheng's prowess in sorcery, he asks the latter to teach him his craft as well as the right path of Taoism. His wish is granted.

Campaigns
Fan Rui is appointed as one of the leaders of the Liangshan infantry after the 108 Stars of Destiny come together in what is called the Grand Assembly. He participates in the campaigns against the Liao invaders and rebel forces in Song territory following amnesty from Emperor Huizong for Liangshan.

In the expedition against Tian Hu, Fan Rui contests with Qiao Daoqing in sorcery and is beaten. His teacher Gongsun Sheng comes to his aid and defeats Qiao, thus sealing the fall of Tian Hu.

Fan Rui is one of the few Liangshan heroes who survive the campaigns. Although awarded an official post, he declines it and chooses to continue Taoist training under Gongsun Sheng as a recluse together with Zhu Wu.

References
 
 
 
 
 
 
 

72 Earthly Fiends
Fictional characters who use magic
Fictional characters from Shandong